Rear Admiral Sir David James Martin,  (15 April 1933 – 10 August 1990) was a senior officer of the Royal Australian Navy and later Governor of New South Wales. He also established the Sir David Martin Foundation to assist young Australians in crisis.

Early life and Naval career
Born in Sydney on 15 April 1933, Martin came from a long line of naval officers. He was descended from Lieutenant George Johnston, one of the Royal Marines of the First Fleet, and the convict Esther Abrahams. Their son, Robert, was the first Australian born person to enlist in the Royal Navy, which he joined in 1805.

Martin attended Scots College in Bellevue Hill from 1939–1946 before joining the RAN as a cadet midshipman and entering the Royal Australian Naval College in 1947.

He was promoted to Commander of the Third Australian Destroyer Squadron in 1974 and commanded several RAN ships, including HMA Ships Queenborough, Torrens, Supply and Melbourne. Martin was promoted to flag rank in 1982 and served as Chief of Naval Personnel and as Commander of Naval Support Command until he retired in February 1988. On 26 January 1985, the Queen appointed Martin an Officer of the Order of Australia (AO) "for service as the Chief of Naval Personnel and flag officer Naval Support Command".

Marriage
Martin married Suzanne Millear in 1957 and had three children, one of whom was a Captain in the Royal Australian Navy.

Later life
Martin was knighted as a Knight Commander of the Order of St Michael and St George (KCMG) in 1988, shortly before being appointed the Governor of New South Wales. Martin set about establishing a relationship between his office as governor and the people of New South Wales. He soon became known as 'the people's Governor'.

Just three days before his death, Martin resigned as governor due to an advancing medical condition. He made arrangements for the Sir David Martin Foundation to be established, which runs programs that help young homeless and disadvantaged Australians.

Sir David died on 10 August 1990 of pleural mesothelioma, a rare form of lung cancer caused by asbestos, to which he was exposed during his naval career. He engendered much respect and sympathy when seen struggling for breath during the final days of his service as governor.

At his funeral the Premier of New South Wales Nick Greiner noted: 

His service in the Royal Australian Navy is commemorated in the Naval Chapel, Garden Island NSW. After his death, Woollahra Council named the former site of HMAS Rushcutter in Rushcutters Bay as the "Sir David Martin Reserve" in his honour.

Titles and honours

Titles
 15 April 19331947: David Martin, Esq
 19471953: Midshipman David Martin RAN
 19531955: Sub-Lieutenant David Martin RAN
 19551963: Lieutenant David Martin RAN
 19631967: Lieutenant Commander David Martin RAN
 19671972: Commander David Martin RAN
 19721979: Captain David Martin RAN
 19791982: Commodore David Martin RAN
 19821984: Rear-Admiral David Martin RAN, Chief of Naval Personnel
 19841985: Rear-Admiral David Martin RAN, Flag Officer, Naval Support Command
 19851988: Rear-Admiral David Martin AO RAN, Flag Officer, Naval Support Command
 19881988: Rear-Admiral David Martin AO
 19881989: Rear-Admiral Sir David Martin KCMG AO
 19891990: His Excellency Rear-Admiral Sir David Martin KCMG AO, Governor of New South Wales
 199010 August 1990: Rear-Admiral Sir David Martin KCMG AO

Honours

References

External links

Sir David Martin Foundation – Helping young people in crisis

1933 births
1990 deaths
Military personnel from New South Wales
Australian people of Scottish descent
Australian military personnel of the Korean War
Deaths from lung cancer
Deaths from mesothelioma
Governors of New South Wales
Graduates of the Royal Naval College, Greenwich
Graduates of the Royal Australian Naval College
Australian Knights Commander of the Order of St Michael and St George
Officers of the Order of Australia
People educated at Scots College (Sydney)
Royal Australian Navy admirals
Knights of Justice of the Order of St John
Deaths from cancer in New South Wales